The red-billed pytilia (Pytilia lineata) is a species of estrildid finch found in Ethiopia. It was split from the red-winged pytilia.

References

Clements, J. F., T. S. Schulenberg, M. J. Iliff, B.L. Sullivan, C. L. Wood, and D. Roberson. 2012. The eBird/Clements checklist of birds of the world: Version 6.7.

red-billed pytilia
Endemic birds of Ethiopia
red-billed pytilia
Taxa named by Theodor von Heuglin